The Steyr ADGZ  was an Austrian heavy armored car used during World War II. It was originally designed for the Austrian Army (designated as the "M35 Mittlerer Panzerwagen") in 1934, and delivered in 1935–1937.

History

The Austrian army was using the ADGZ armored car at the time of the Anschluss, with 12 being used by the army and 15 by police. The Germans also employed the vehicles for police work, with some taken by the Waffen-SS and utilized on the Eastern Front, as well as in the Balkans for anti-partisan activity and other purposes.

The SS ordered an additional 25 ADGZ armored cars, which were delivered in 1942. An interesting feature of the vehicle was that there was no "rear"; either end was capable of driving the unit.

As part of the initial operations of the Invasion of Poland, the SS Heimwehr Danzig used three ADGZ armored cars during the attack on the Polish Post Office in Danzig, but one was lost during the battle. Some ADGZs were also supplied to the  Army of the Independent State of Croatia.

References 

World War II armoured cars
Armoured fighting vehicles of Austria
Armoured cars of the interwar period
Military vehicles introduced in the 1930s